Walter James McPherson (December 5, 1916 – January 12, 2013) was an American basketball coach and was regarded as one of the best at San Jose State University, and former West Coast Athletic Conference commissioner. McPherson graduated from San Jose State in 1939 and played as a fullback through 1936 and 1938 trained by Dudley DeGroot. He became a basketball coach and assistant football coach, he also managed to get his basketball team in the NCAA Tournament which was the team's first time in the tournament. He also taught Carroll Williams and Billy Wilson who also started their own sport careers. McPherson retired from coaching in 1960.

Personal life
McPherson was involved in World War II and became a lieutenant in the United States Navy. He became a member of San Jose Sports Hall of Fame in 2006. McPherson died in 2013 in Santa Rosa, California. He is survived by two children, including poet and University of California, Davis professor Sandra McPherson.

Head coaching record

References

External links
 

1916 births
2013 deaths
American men's basketball coaches
American football fullbacks
American men's basketball players
American military personnel of World War II
Basketball coaches from California
Basketball players from San Jose, California
San Jose State Spartans athletic directors
San Jose State Spartans baseball coaches
San Jose State Spartans baseball players
San Jose State Spartans football coaches
San Jose State Spartans football players
San Jose State Spartans men's basketball coaches
San Jose State Spartans men's basketball players
West Coast Conference commissioners
United States Navy officers
Players of American football from San Jose, California